is a passenger railway station located in the city of Chōfu, Tokyo, Japan, operated by the private railway operator Keio Corporation. It serves as the main train station for access to Ajinomoto Stadium, home of J. League football teams F.C. Tokyo and Tokyo Verdy.

Lines 
Tobitakyū Station is served by the Keio Line, and is located 17.7 kilometers from the starting point of the line at Shinjuku Station.

Station layout 
This station has a side platform and an island platform with an elevated station building.

Platforms

History
The station opened on 1 September 1916.

Passenger statistics
In fiscal 2019, the station was used by an average of 28,284 passengers daily. 

The passenger figures (boarding passengers only) for previous years are as shown below.

Surrounding area
 Ajinomoto Stadium

See also
 List of railway stations in Japan

References

External links

Keio Railway Station Information 

Keio Line
Stations of Keio Corporation
Railway stations in Tokyo
Chōfu, Tokyo
Railway stations in Japan opened in 1916